Francis Edmund Baines (18 June 1864 – 17 November 1948)  was an English amateur first-class cricketer, who played in the drawn 1888 Roses match for Yorkshire against Lancashire, played at Bramall Lane, Sheffield. A right-handed batsman and right arm medium-fast bowler, Baines was bowled for a duck by Napier, and not called upon to bowl. This was his only first-class game.

Baines was born in Ecclesall, Sheffield, and died in Worksop, Nottinghamshire, at the age of 84.

References

1864 births
1948 deaths
Yorkshire cricketers
Cricketers from Sheffield
English cricketers
English cricketers of 1864 to 1889